Aleksandr Vasilievich Shevchenko (24 May 1882, Kharkiv – 28 August 1948, Moscow) was a Ukrainian modernist painter and sculptor.

Biography 
From 1890 to 1898, he took private drawing lessons from Dmytro Bezperchy and was employed by a workshop that produced theater sets. He then moved to Moscow and entered the Stroganov State Academy of Arts and Industry; graduating in 1907. That same year, he was admitted to the Moscow School of Painting, Sculpture and Architecture, where he studied with Valentin Serov and Konstantin Korovin. In between, from 1905 to 1906, he spent some time in Paris at the Académie Julian with Étienne Dinet and Jean-Paul Laurens. He also made the acquaintance of Mikhail Larionov and his followers. Under their influence, he worked in the Neo-Primitivist and, later, Rayonist styles. He was expelled from the school in 1909.

After 1911, he took part in exhibitions held by the Soyuz Molodyozhi (Union of Youth) in Saint Petersburg and participated in the first Moscow Salon. In 1912, he had a major showing with the Donkey's Tail, a radical modernist group. The following year, he published two works of art theory; "Neo-primitivism, its Theory, its Possibilities, its Achievements and The Principles of Cubism and Other Trends in World Art of All Times and All People. In these works, he defends the spontaneity of Russian folk art and the lubok (a popular print style), and claims that it has "oriental" roots.

From 1913 until 1921, he participated in the exhibitions organized by the magazine Mir Iskusstva (The World of Art). For a brief period, he painted in the Cubo-Futurist atyle. He was called for service by the army in 1914, but was not mobilized until 1917, shortly before the October Revolution. After that, he was attached to the "Plastic Arts Section", established by the new People's Commissariat for Education (NARKOMPROS) and was assigned to their college in Moscow, where he helped to direct the contemporary art workshop. Later, he taught at Vkhutemas and, typical for that  time, was a member of numerous government committees. In 1920, he was named to the Institute of Artistic Culture.

Throughout the 1920s, he was a regular participant in state-sponsored exhibitions; notably the First Russian Art Exhibition in Berlin (1922). During the 1930s, he travelled to Azerbaijan, Georgia and Kazakhstan, creating Orientalist works and gathering evidence for his theory on the origins of Russian art. The Tatar artist, Baqi Urmançe, was one of his students. After 1941, he headed the Department of Painting at the Moscow State Textile University. In his final years, he was accused of "Formalism", but was able to continue painting.

Selected works

References

 Biography @ Энциклопедия Кругосвет
 Brief biography @ Академик

External links 

More works by Shevchenko @ ArtNet

1880s births
1948 deaths
Neo-primitivism
Russian avant-garde
20th-century Russian painters
Ukrainian sculptors
Ukrainian painters
Ukrainian male sculptors
Russian male painters
Académie Julian alumni
20th-century Russian male artists
Moscow School of Painting, Sculpture and Architecture alumni
Stroganov Moscow State Academy of Arts and Industry alumni